The Automatic Motorist is a 1911 British short  silent comedy film, directed by Walter R. Booth, featuring a robot chauffeur taking an inventor and a young honeymooning couple on a wild ride around the planets and under the sea. The trick film is a, "virtual remake of The '?' Motorist (1906)," according to Michael Brooke of BFI Screenonline, "but on a bigger scale."

References

External links

Full film on BFI Player

British black-and-white films
British silent short films
1911 comedy films
1911 films
1911 short films
Robot films
British comedy short films
Films directed by Walter R. Booth
1910s British films
Silent comedy films